Ben Batger, (born 20 March 1984 in Sydney, Australia) is a professional rugby union footballer. He attended The King's School, Parramatta, playing in the 1st XV. His usual position is fullback or wing. He has played for the New South Wales Waratahs and ACT Brumbies in the Super Rugby competition, and for Hawkes Bay in New Zealand's provincial competition, the Air New Zealand Cup. In 2009, he played for Pro Recco in Italy. He also represented the Greater Sydney Rams in the Australian National Rugby Competition . He played his club football with Eastwood Rugby club where he won several premiership and holds several point scoring records. 

Post playing he turned to coaching where he successfully lead Old Mission Beach Athletic Club to a California Cup title in 2016 . He then returned home as an assistant coach at Eastwood and Greater Sydney Rams in 2017/18. In 2019 he was named Head Coach of Eastwood Rugby Club . He took Eastwood to their first grand final in 5 years in 2020.

External links
 Waratahs profile

1984 births
Living people
Australian rugby union players
Rugby union fullbacks
Rugby union wings
New South Wales Waratahs players
ACT Brumbies players
Greater Sydney Rams players
Hawke's Bay rugby union players
Rugby union players from Sydney